Ingela Agardh (27 October 1948 – 17 June 2008) was a Swedish journalist and television presenter.

Biography
She was born Ingela Gunnel Elisabeth Mothander on 27 October 1948 in Sundsvall, Sweden. Before becoming a journalist, she worked at a mental hospital. She graduated 1970 from journalism school in Gothenburg and became a journalist in 1971 for Sveriges Radio in Sundsvall, 1979 at Radio Göteborg and Sundsvall again in 1979.

In 1980 she became a studio reporter and news anchor for Sveriges Televisions Aktuellt. She was a presenter for Hemma and made frequent appearances as a host for  Gomorron Sverige (on Sveriges Television), and participated as a contestant in the quiz show På spåret where she and Stefan Holm won in 2003. In her book Den största nyheten (2008) she wrote about her newfound Christian beliefs.

Death
During the summer of 1987 she was diagnosed with breast cancer. She died of the disease on 17 June 2008 in Malmköping at age 59.

Personal life
The daughter of civil engineer Arne Mothander and his wife, Gunnel ( Markstrom), she married Veijo Agardh on 15 April 1982. They had one child, a daughter named Charlotta.

Filmography
 1995 – Som krossat glas i en hårt knuten hand (as herself)
 2001 – Reuter & Skoog (TV-series; as herself; one episode)

Bibliography

References
''This article is completely or partly based on material from the Swedish Wikipedia, Ingela Agardh (from 20 March 2014).

Notes

External links
 Ingela Agardh profile, Swedish Film Database; accessed 26 October 2014
 

1948 births
2008 deaths
Swedish television hosts
Swedish women television presenters
Swedish women journalists
Deaths from cancer in Sweden
Deaths from breast cancer
People from Sundsvall
20th-century Swedish journalists